Aglaureion was an ancient sanctuary located in Athens, Greece. It was dedicated to Aglauros, a mythological figure who was the daughter of King Cecrops and the sister of Erysichthon, Pandrosus, and Herse. The sanctuary was believed to be the site where Aglauros had sacrificed herself to protect the city from invasion. The exact location of the Aglaureion is uncertain, but it is believed to have been located on the north slope of the Acropolis.

External links
http://www.stoa.org/athens/sites/eastslope.html

Acropolis of Athens
Ancient Greek buildings and structures in Athens